Thornton is an unincorporated community in Taylor County, West Virginia, United States. Thornton is located on Three Fork Creek along the Northwestern Turnpike (US 50) at its junction with County Route 7. Thornton also hosts an annual Pumpkin Festival. Thornton contains a Volunteer Fire Department, Post Office, and Taylor County's Judge Alan Moats' residence.

After his 1976 escape from prison in Pennsylvania, the sex cult leader George Feigley hid on a farm near Thornton. He and his followers referred to the farm as the "Aaron Farm", and used it as a compound until Feigley was recaptured in 1978.

Historic site 

Thornton United Methodist Church (1912)

References 

Unincorporated communities in Taylor County, West Virginia
Unincorporated communities in West Virginia
Northwestern Turnpike
Clarksburg micropolitan area